James J. Phillips is an American college athletic administrator. He is the commissioner of the Atlantic Coast Conference (ACC), a position he has held since 2021. Phillips served as the athletic director at Northern Illinois University from 2004 to 2008 and Northwestern University from 2008 to 2021.

Phillips is a Chicago native and graduated from the University of Illinois.

References

External links
 Atlantic Coast Conference profile

Year of birth missing (living people)
Living people
Atlantic Coast Conference commissioners
Northern Illinois Huskies athletic directors
Northwestern Wildcats athletic directors
Arizona State University alumni
University of Illinois Urbana-Champaign alumni
University of Tennessee alumni